Zaretis is a Neotropical nymphalid butterfly genus in the subfamily Charaxinae.

Species
Listed alphabetically:
 Zaretis callidryas (R. Felder, 1869) – ghost leafwing
 Zaretis ellops (Ménétriés, 1855) – holey leafwing
 Zaretis isadora (Cramer, [1779]) – Cramer's leafwing
 Zaretis itys (Cramer, [1777]) – skeletonized leafwing
 Zaretis syene (Hewitson, 1856)

References

Anaeini
Nymphalidae of South America
Taxa named by Jacob Hübner
Butterfly genera